Narrow Road to the Deep North is a 1968 satirical play on the British Empire by the English playwright Edward Bond.

It is a political parable set in Japan in the Edo period. It deals with the poet Basho and the changing political landscape over about 35 years.

The play won Bond the John Whiting Award for 1968.

Quotation 
Of course, that's only a symbol, but we need symbols to protect us from ourselves.

The censor
Because of the play's scenes of violence (it was known in the press as "The One With Five Dead Babies and a Disembowelling"), it was originally refused a theatrical license by the Lord Chamberlain, though permission was eventually given after Bond agreed to some last minute amendments.

Original production
It was first performed in 1968 for the Peoples and Cities conference at the Belgrade Theatre, Coventry, in a production directed by Jane Howell:
Basho, old, a priest - Peter Needham
Kiro, twenty - Paul Howes
Argi - Malcolm Ingram
Tola - Christopher Matthews
Heigoo - John Rowe
Breebree - Gordon Reid
Shogo, twenty-five - Edward Peel
Prime Minister - Peter Sproule
Commodore, forty-seven - Nigel Hawthorne
Georgina, thirty-nine - Susan Williamson
Peasants, soldiers, tars, tribesmen, etc. - 
Alison King
Diana Berriman
Alan David
Geoffrey White                               
Vandra Edwards
Malcolm Ingram
Christopher Matthews
John Rowe
Gordon Reid
Peter Sproule

Royal Court Theatre
The play was then staged as part of an Edward Bond season at the Royal Court in 1969, to mark the abolition of stage censorship the previous year.

Critical reception
Bond said he "knew the critics would like it, and they did." The Independent's Maeve Walsh reported that Narrow Road to the Deep North was found by the critics to be cryptic but was still admired overall. The Observer called it "a funny, ironic and beautiful play...In a series of short elegant scenelets, Brechtian in style, but with a sly mock-Zen lightness all their own, the play compares, and finally equates, the tyranny of brute force and religious conscience." Clive Barnes of The New York Times, despite praising earlier productions, criticized the Vivian Beaumont Theater performance as "distressingly tedious" for the acting and staging. Barnes wrote, "The writing has a fake Oriental archness to it—a solemnity, at times a pomposity. Yet the ideas are fresh. [...]  Narrow Road to the Deep North is far better play than it would appear to be from its Lincoln Center production. But on just how much better I will for the moment hold my peace."

Ann Marie Demling noted that it is one of the Bond plays to which "awards and citations of excellence have been given" along with Saved (1965), Lear (1971), Bingo (1973) and The Fool (1975). Richard Stayton of Los Angeles Times wrote that "Bond’s metaphor for the Vietnam War unfortunately travels neatly into the 1990s as a mirror to such tragedies as Bosnia", but panned the performance he had seen (which was by The Actors' Gang). Gerry Colgan of The Irish Times wrote in 2001 that while Bond's works were not generally well-known in Ireland, Narrow Road to the Deep North was a play that had "[resonated] down the years" along with Saved (1965). Michael Mangan described it as one of Bond's "major plays" in a 2018 book on the dramatist. Academic Amer Hamed Suliman dubbed it "one of Edward Bond's most significant works" in 2019.

References 
 Review, Educational Theatre Journal, 24(2):195–197, May 1972.
 Narrow Road to the Deep North, by Edward Bond, Methuen Modern Plays, 1981, .

Notes

External links

1968 plays
British Empire
Plays by Edward Bond
Plays set in Japan
Plays set in the 17th century